Vinh is the biggest city and economic and cultural center of north-central Vietnam. Vinh is the capital of Nghệ An Province, and is a key point in the East–West economic corridor linking Myanmar, Thailand, Laos and Vietnam. The city is situated in the south-east of the province, alongside the Lam River (Song Lam) and is located on the main north–south transportation route of Vietnam, easily accessible by highway, railroad, boat and air. The recently expanded Vinh International Airport is served daily by four carriers: Vietnam Airlines, VietJet Air, Bamboo Airways and Jetstar Pacific. On September 5, 2008, it was upgraded from Grade-II city to Grade-I city, the fifth Grade-I city of Vietnam after Haiphong, Đà Nẵng and Huế. Vinh is the most populous city in the North Central Coastal region, with over 490,000 residents (2015 estimate). The city is bordered by Nghi Loc district to the north and east, Hung Nguyen district to the west, and Nghi Xuan district in Hà Tĩnh Province to the south.

History
Vinh was originally known as Ke Van. Later, this successively became Ke Vinh, Vinh Giang, Vinh Doanh, and then Vinh Thi. Eventually, in 1789, the official name became simply Vinh, probably under European influence. The name has remained the same ever since. At various times, Vinh has been of considerable military and political significance. The Vietnamese nation began in the north, and only gradually expanded to cover its current territories – as such, Vinh was sometimes seen as a "gateway to the south".

The Tây Sơn dynasty (1788–1802) is believed to have considered Vinh as a possible capital of Vietnam, but the short duration of the dynasty meant that any plans did not come to fruition. Tây Sơn interest in the city did, however, result in considerable construction and development there. Under French rule of Vietnam, Vinh was further developed as an industrial center, and became well known for its factories.

Historically, Vinh and its surrounding areas have often been important centers of rebellion and revolutionary activity. In the 19th century and the early 20th century, the city was the center of several prominent uprisings against the French. In addition, a number of notable revolutionary figures were born in or near the city of Vinh, including Nguyễn Du, Phan Bội Châu, Trần Trọng Kim, Nguyễn Thị Minh Khai, and Hồ Chí Minh.

The city of Vinh was once the site of a number of significant historic sites, particularly an ancient citadel. Over the years, however, Vinh has been extensively damaged in a number of wars. In the 1950s, fighting between the French colonial powers and the Việt Minh resistance forces destroyed much of the city, and further damage was done by United States bombing in the Vietnam War. As such, little of the original city remains today. The reconstruction of Vinh borrowed heavily on Soviet and East German ideas about town planning, and was conducted with considerable East German assistance – the city is noted for its wide streets and its rows of concrete apartment blocks.

Climate
Vinh has a dry winter humid subtropical climate (Köppen Cwa), bordering on the tropical monsoon climate (Am) of the Central Coast.

Economy
The service sector comprises the largest part of Vinh's economy, with around 55% of the working population being employed in this area. This is followed by the industrial sector (around 30%) and the agriculture, forestry, and fishing sectors (around 15%). Vinh is an important transportation hub, having a key position on the route between the northern and southern parts of the country, and is also a notable port.

Tourism
Vinh and Nghe An province are rapidly growing tourist destinations on the north central coast of Vietnam, and are home to various attractions. The city features several unique sites including Song Lam (Light Blue River), Ho Chi Minh Square, Phuong Hoang Trung Do (Phoenix Capital with Quang Trung King Temple), Dung Quyet Mountain with picturesque and breathtaking scenery of the Lam River, Hong Linh Mountain Rank and East Vietnam Sea.

A local tour company offers guided tours of Pu Mat in English or Vietnamese, with the chance to explore Khe Kem Waterfall, Giang River boat trip, Pha Lai Dam, and “Sang Le” Forest.

He was a famous poem in the world with The Tale of Kieu.
Which is an ecological tourist area and bold cultural-historical-Nghe An. Quyet Mountain Park was built on the basis of preserving a cultural heritage-historical over 200 years. It was Phuong Hoang Trung Do (Phoenix Centre Capital) of Quang Trung King.
There are many wild animals from every part of the world, such as rhinos, giraffes, white tigers, yellow tigers, bears, elephants, hippos, zebras, hyenas and jaguars.
Tourists can enjoy views beach by climbing to the top of Heaven Gate mountain. It can be said "Da Lat on the sea". 
Those flowers are in full bloom from late March to mid-April and mid-December yearly.
The pagoda was built during the Tran kings attached to the Princess Dieu Thien. It was dubbed "First Hoan Chau spots" not only because this place is a unique landscape, but also because of the ancient sediments were handed thousands of years. Tourists can travel there by bus, boat trips on Nha Duong Lake, take the cable car up the mountain.
Home to a diverse wildlife including tigers and elephants it has become a popular destination for trekkers. Tours to Pu Mat National Park can be booked departing from Vinh.

Notable sites

Other notable tourist attractions are the Hong Son Temple and Quyet Mountain. Hong Son Temple is one of the few large temples to escape the closures implemented by the Communist authorities after the war, and is the site of an important festival on the 20th day of the eighth lunar month. Quyet Mountain, on the edge of Vinh, is used as a peaceful retreat from the city, with visitors climbing four hundred steps to the summit. From the summit, the whole of Vinh may be seen, along with the river and farmland surrounding it. The mountain is covered with pine trees, although the forest is still not completely recovered from its destruction by bombing during the war. Other places of interest include the Nghệ Tĩnh Soviet Museum (commemorating the major Nghệ An uprising against the French in the 1930s) and the Cửa Lò beach resort (a popular destination for citizens of Hanoi).

Entertainment
  Recreation center VRC on Phan Boi Chau street, near Vinh Station. It has a lot of exciting games such as bowling, pool, 4 seasons, racing, fitness, beauty, Lotte Cinema Center ...
  City Hub (1st Le Hong Phong): Complex of entertainment center, Galaxy Cinema, food...
  Film Center North Central of Viet Nam on Quang Trung Street.
  Parks: Centre, Cua Nam, Cua Bac, Nguyen Tat Thanh, Cua Nam lake

Museums
 Soviet Nghe Tinh Museum (No 10 Dao Tan street): 
Characteristics: Museum displaying relics and documents during the Xo Viet Nghe Tinh highs 1930–1931.
This is a unique cultural works preserve over 5,000 original artefacts and documents express the spirit of the unyielding revolution of Nghe Tinh people in the Soviet highs 1930–1931.
The museum was built in 1960 on a beautiful campus. The museum attracts a large number of domestic and foreign visitors.
In front of the Museum, there is a vestiges where President Ho Chi Minh talked with officials and people of Nghe An when he visited the country in 1957 and the Vinh City Stadium. Behind the museum is a deep ditch surrounded. On the right is Ta Gate, on the left door of the ancient Vinh.
This is the place where the original artefacts and the original image of the local movement and collections such as the drums used in the struggle, the collection of publications, the weapons collection, the collection of children The collection and artefacts of the Party cadres ... and a list of systems of 49 vestiges of the Soviet Union in Nghe An province are classified by the Ministry of Culture and Information as national historical monuments.
 Nghe An General Museum (No 4 Dao Tan street): General Museum introduces the whole country, people, history, culture and continuous activities and typical people of Nghe An from ancient to present. The museum has many artefacts unearthed in Nghe An: archaeological sites of Village Vac, cultural sites of Quynh Van.
The museum has displayed in detail the formation and development of Nghe An inhabitants during the period of history from the ancient Vietnamese who left traces at Tham Tham, Quy Chau district, thousand years, to residents of the culture of Son Vi and Hoa Binh (from 200 thousand years to 9 thousand years ago) and continuously to this day. The history of Nghe An has been richly presented.
 Museum of Military Region 4

Education
 Vinh University
 Vinh Medical University
 Vinh University of Technical Education

Food
There are some unique dishes originating in Vinh and the surrounding areas in Nghe An and Ha Tinh, including cháo lươn (spicy eel soup), bánh mướt (steamed rice rolls), kẹo Cu Đơ (peanut rice paper candy), Vinh orange.

Architecture
Many houses in Vinh have a unique style, heavily influenced by the climate of the region. Many houses have a dome, and a taijitu sign.

People
Vinh locals are warm and hospitable, and often go at length to make visitors feel welcome. Children and adults alike are always enthusiastic and cheerful when meeting foreigners. Vinh and Nghe An locals maintain very strong cultural traditions that are a part of their provincial and national identity.

Infrastructure

Airport 
Vinh International Airport, located at  North from the city center, is the fifth busiest airport in Vietnam. The airport has domestic connections to Hồ Chí Minh City, Hà Nội, Đà Nẵng, Buôn Ma Thuột, Đà Lạt, Nha Trang and Pleiku.

Road 
 National Route 1A to Ha Noi, Ho Chi Minh City
 National Route 7 to Luang Prabang
 National Route 8 to Vientiane
 National Route 46 to Vientiane

Seaway 
 Vissai seaport includes 2 berths: International wharf area and inland wharf area. The international wharf area consists of 3 wharves for ships of 30,000 to 70,000 DWT. The wharf area of 7 berths will receive the fleet of 3000 ÷ 10,000 DWT.

Railway 
Vinh Station is a major station along the North–South Railway.

Bus system 
There many bus routes in the inner city, neighborhood

Industrial zone 
 VSIP  West of Central with the area 750 hectares
 WHAIZ  North of Central with the area 3000 hectares
 Nam Cam 15 North of Central with the area 
 Bac Vinh with the area 
 Cua Lo East of Central with the area

Public transportation network 
In Vinh are three bus stations:

 Vinh Market bus station, through which it is possible to reach Vientiane by bus.
 Central Bus Station; KM 20 Vinh Road, Block 2, Vinh Tan Ward, Vinh City

References

Notes

External links
 

 
Populated places in Nghệ An province
Districts of Nghệ An province
Provincial capitals in Vietnam
Cities in Vietnam